Kevin Hynes (born 28 May 1986) is an Irish hurler who played as a full-back for the Galway senior team.

Hynes made his first appearance for the team during the 2009 championship and eventually established himself as the first-choice full-back. An All-Ireland-winning captain in the under-21 grade, he has won Leinster and National Hurling League medals at senior level.  

At club level Hynes plays with the Sarsfields senior hurling team, and in the Galway Senior Hurling Championship, Hynes won his first senior county winners medal on 22 November in the 2015 county final v Craughwell at Pearse Stadium.

Honours
Galway Senior Hurling Championship (1): 2015
Leinster Senior Hurling Championship (1): 2012
National Hurling League (1): 2010
Walsh Cup (1): 2010
All-Ireland Under-21 Hurling Championship (1): 2007 [c]
All-Ireland Minor Hurling Championship (1): 2004

References

1986 births
Living people
Hurling backs
Galway inter-county hurlers
Connacht inter-provincial hurlers
Sarsfields (Galway) hurlers